FK Rad is a professional football club based in Banjica, Belgrade, Serbia.

Managers

References

External links
 

 
Rad